Bhaal may refer to:
 Bhaal (Forgotten Realms), a deity in the Forgotten Realms setting of Dungeons and Dragons
 the Bhal region of India

See also 
 Baal, a term applied to deities in ancient Semitic religions